Madison Business College was the name of a business college in Madison, Wisconsin, founded in 1858.

History
The college was also known as Northwestern Business College and School of Shorthand, Capital City Commercial College, Madison College, Madison Junior College, and Madison Junior Business College; it closed on September 22, 1998.

Steiger's Educational Directory for 1878 classified it as, "Institute of Penmanship and Telegraph; Classical, Scientific and Musical Academy". In the mid-1880s, it issued at least two copies of a magazine named The School Visitor.

Notable alumni
Notable alumni include: 
 Liberian President and Nobel Prize winner Ellen Johnson Sirleaf
 Wisconsin governor Albert G. Schmedeman
 Wisconsin Secretary of State and legislator John S. Donald
 State Treasurer, and Assemblyman Andrew H. Dahl
 State Senator Albert M. Stondall
 State Assemblyman D. D. Conway
 State Assemblyman Joanne M. Duren
 State Assemblyman Hugh Pierce Jamieson
 State Assemblyman Daniel O. Mahoney
 State Assemblyman Edward C. Meland
 State Assemblyman Herbert C. Schenk
 State Assemblyman Thomas A. Stewart
 C. L. Brusletten, a member of the Minnesota House of Representatives
George B. Curtiss, United States Attorney for the Northern District of New York
 Charles S. Eastman, a member of the South Dakota House of Representatives
 Leo Kieffer, Maine State Senator

References 

Business schools in Wisconsin
Educational institutions established in 1858

Education in Madison, Wisconsin
1858 establishments in Wisconsin
Defunct private universities and colleges in Wisconsin
1998 disestablishments in Wisconsin